Lenny & Sid is a cartoon series of films and shorts founded by the former Disney animator/director Tony Bancroft and produced by Toonacious Entertainment. The cartoons are Christian-themed, aimed to teach valuable morals to an audience. The films are 22 minutes long and take place in a modern-day neighborhood in which Lenny Harres the rabbit and Sid Appleton the mouse become friends and help one another throughout their school year. The shorts are 7 minutes long, silent with only music tracks and are based on Bible Stories.

Cartoons

Commercial performance
During its release week, "Love Thy Neighbor" was premiered at churches in the top 25 children's video markets. To boost its promotion, the Toonacious held a contest with the prize being a trip for a Disney vacation in addition to retail material. From a number of Christian Retail stores, the two films were released on VHS and DVD.

References

External links
Official Website

2003 films
2003 animated films
2000s American animated films
2000s animated short films
Christian animation
Animated film series
Short film series
Portrayals of the Virgin Mary in film
Films based on the Bible
Animated films about rabbits and hares
Films about mice and rats
Films directed by Tony Bancroft
Film series introduced in 2003